Roslandy del Valle Acosta Alvarado (born ) is a Venezuelan female volleyball player. She was part of the Venezuela women's national volleyball team. She competed with the national team at the 2008 Summer Olympics.

Clubs
  Kangasala (2014)
  Volley Koniz (2015)
  Vilsbiburg (2016)
  SC Potsdam (2017)
  Volley Bergamo (2018)
  Itambé Minas(2020)
  Denso Airybees (2021)

See also
 Venezuela at the 2008 Summer Olympics

References

External links
http://www.maz-online.de/Nachrichten/Sport/SC-Potsdam-verpflichtet-Topspielerin-Roslandy-Acosta
http://www.cev.lu/Competition-Area/PlayerDetails.aspx?TeamID=8771&PlayerID=59219&ID=740
Roslandy Acosta at Sports Reference
http://www.uatrav.com/sports/article_eeb63080-22d3-5241-b23e-909d139807dc.html

1992 births
Living people
Venezuelan women's volleyball players
Volleyball players at the 2008 Summer Olympics
Olympic volleyball players of Venezuela
20th-century Venezuelan women
21st-century Venezuelan women